Christopher "C. J." Henderson, Jr. (born September 30, 1998) is an American football cornerback for the Carolina Panthers of the National Football League (NFL). He played college football at Florida and was drafted by the Jacksonville Jaguars ninth overall in the 2020 NFL Draft.

Early life and high school career
Henderson was born and grew up in Miami, Florida, and attended Christopher Columbus High School. He played both running back and cornerback for the Explorers' football team and was invited to play in the All-America Bowl as a senior. He was ranked a four-star prospect and initially committed to play at the University of Miami before de-committing to evaluate other offers. Henderson ultimately signed a letter of intent to play at the University of Florida.

College career
As a true freshman, Henderson appeared in 11 games for the Gators with five starts and made 22 tackles with four interceptions. He became the first freshman in Florida's history to return an interception for a touchdown in back-to-back games after doing so in his first two career games against Michigan and Tennessee. In his sophomore year, his first full season as a starter, Henderson recorded 38 tackles, two sacks and two forced fumbles with two interceptions and a team-high seven passes defended and was named second-team All-Southeastern Conference by the league's coaches.

Henderson entered his junior season as a preseason first-team All-SEC selection, third-team preseason All-America, and on the Bednarik Award watchlist. Henderson was also named a second-team midseason All-American by the Associated Press despite missing four games due to injury. Henderson finished his junior season with 33 tackles (three for loss), a sack and 11 passes broken up in nine games and was named first-team All-SEC by the league's coaches and a second-team All-American by the FWAA. Following the end of the Gators' regular season, Henderson announced that he would forgo his final year of eligibility to enter the 2020 NFL Draft and also skip Florida's bowl game. Henderson finished his collegiate career with 93 tackles, 26 passes broken up and six interceptions in 33 games played.

Statistics

Professional career

Jacksonville Jaguars
Henderson was selected by the Jacksonville Jaguars in the first round with the ninth overall pick in the 2020 NFL Draft. On July 16, 2020, Henderson signed his four-year rookie contract, worth a fully guaranteed $20.5 million. Henderson made his NFL debut in the season opener on September 13, 2020, against the Indianapolis Colts, starting and recording five tackles and his first career interception, picking off a pass from Philip Rivers and returning it for 22 yards, and defending three passes, including breaking up a pass on a fourth down late in the fourth quarter to secure a Jaguars' 27–20 win, and was named the Pepsi NFL Rookie of the Week.
In Week 10 against the Green Bay Packers, Henderson forced a fumble on wide receiver Davante Adams which was recovered by teammate Myles Jack during the 24–20 loss. He was placed on injured reserve on November 19, 2020, with a groin injury. 
One website rated him as the worst Jaguars draft pick of the past 5 years.

Carolina Panthers
On September 27, 2021, Henderson was traded to the Carolina Panthers with a 2022 fifth-round pick in exchange for tight end Dan Arnold and a 2022 third-round pick.
While visiting Doral, FL and the state of his upbringing on February 5, 2022, C.J. Henderson was arrested after a traffic stop in which there was found a concealed firearm, a 9mm Glock 45, and about 3 grams of Marijuana. He was not legally possessing either item and it was not clear from paperwork who was the registered owner of the Lamborghini Urus SUV that had overly dark tinted windows(initial reason for the stop). Bodycam recordings of the incident have been posted on YouTube.

NFL career statistics

References

External links
Jacksonville Jaguars bio
Florida Gators bio
 

1998 births
Living people
Players of American football from Miami
Christopher Columbus High School (Miami-Dade County, Florida) alumni
American football cornerbacks
Florida Gators football players
Jacksonville Jaguars players
Carolina Panthers players